no-go zone may refer to:

A no-go area, a region where the ruling authorities have lost control and are unable to enforce the rule of law
Areas where fishing is made illegal due to overfishing
Protected areas for the preservation of environmental, biological, or historical value
A free-fire zone, in U.S. military parlance